Victoria Wilson-James is an American-born British singer, songwriter and record producer. Born and raised in Gary, Indiana, she performed in various theatre plays and musicals as a teenager. Following the release of her debut single "I Want You in My Movie", she was recruited by Jazzie B to join a newly reformed line-up of R&B group Soul II Soul. Managed by her bandmate, Jazzie B, the group became one of London's best-selling groups of all time. Their second album, Vol. II: 1990 – A New Decade (1990), which achieved gold-status in the US and UK, featured the top-charting single "A Dream's a Dream" with Wilson-James on lead vocals.

Following her exit from the group at the end of 1990, she released her debut solo album, Perseverance (1991), which contained hits "Through" and "Bright Lights". In 1993, she joined The Shamen and continued performing and recording with them until their disbandment in 1999. In 1997, she released her second album Colorfields, which featured one of her signature hits "Reach 4 the Melody". Wilson-James has also appeared in various theatre musicals including The Wiz (2001), Purlie (2004), and Lush Life (2005). She formed a duo called Avitas and released an album called "A Course in Miracles" in September 2005.

In June 2012, Soul II Soul received the honorary Heritage Award from Performing Right Society, which Wilson-James also received despite not being able to attend. In March 2013, she released her third album titled The Rapture.

Early life
Wilson-James attended the Los Angeles Academy of Performing Arts, where she graduated with a degree in Theatre Arts. She also attended Phil Moore's Singers Workshop in Hollywood.

Career
In 1988, she released her first single "I Want You in My Movie" on Risin' Records. In 1990, Jazzie B recruited Wilson-James to join British music group Soul II Soul after the departure of their previous members Rose Windross, Doreen Waddell, and Caron Wheeler. In May 1990, Soul II Soul released the second single "A Dream's a Dream", which featured Wilson-James on lead vocals; from their album Vol. II: 1990 – A New Decade. The song peaked in the top-ten on the UK Singles Chart. In the same month, Soul II Soul released their second album Vol. II: 1990 – A New Decade, which peaked at number one on the UK Albums Chart. The album also became certified gold-status in the United Kingdom. Wilson-James also toured with the group in the summer of 1990. One of their concerts was recorded at Brixton Academy and released in September 1990 titled A New Decade: Live from Brixton Academy. Following the conclusion of the tour, she left to pursue a solo career.

In late 1980, she began recording her first album, which would be produced by fellow Soul II Soul members Jazzie B and Nellee Hooper. On March 26, 1991, she released her first album Perseverance, which peaked at number 55 on Billboard's R&B Albums chart. In March 1991, the album's lead single "Through" was released and peaked at number 22 on Billboard's Hot R&B/Hip-Hop Songs chart. She also promoted the album by performing on various musical variety shows including The Party Machine with Nia Peeples, Soul Train, The Word, and Video Soul. In July 1991, she released the second single "Bright Lights", which peaked at number 83 on the R&B Songs chart. The album's final single "One World" was released in late 1991.

In 1993, she became the front woman for techno-pop band The Shamen. In 1995, they released their first album together called Axis Mutatis, which peaked at number 27 on the UK Album chart. The album spawned the singles "Destination Eschaton" and "Transamazonia", which peaked in the top-thirty on the UK Singles Chart. The final single "Heal (The Separation)" peaked at number 31 on the UK Singles Chart. In September 1996, the group released an album titled Hempton Manor. Shortly after the album, the group went on hiatus.

In 1997, Wilson-James released a single titled "Reach 4 the Melody". Her second album "Colorfields" was released in 1997 on the Dance Pool recording label. In 1998, she re-joined The Shamen for their final album called "UV". Their last single "Universal" was released before their amicable split in 1999. In 1999, she returned to musical theatre and played Roxy, a role created for her, in the UK musical "Oh What a Night!". In 2001, she played the role of "Glinda", the good witch of the South, in the UK production of "The Wiz".

In 2001, she appeared on Superchumbo's single "The Revolution", which peaked at number 43 on the Dance Club Songs chart. The song also peaked at number 37 on the Hot Dance Maxi-Singles Sales chart. In 2002, she was featured on Mr. C's single "Circles of Love" for his debut album "Change". In 2004, Victoria starred as "Greta" in the film Road to Damascus, directed by Chris Munro. In the same year, she played the role of "Missy Judson" in the musical Purlie.

In early 2005, Wilson-James starred in the theatre musical Lush Life, where she play the role of The Cop. Again, her performance garnered excellent reviews. In June 2005, she collaborated with Ralph Falcon on the song "Swim" for the compilation album Café Mambo Ibiza 2005. In 2005, Wilson-James created a musical duo called Avitas, with musician Kinan Atassi. As Avitas, they released an album called "A Course in Miracles" in September 2005. The album featured the singles "Re-Creation" and "Cantate".

In March 2007, she released a two-disc compilation album titled Indestructible, which spawned the single "Yo' Freek". She was also featured on Ralph Falcon's single "I Need Someone", which peaked at number two on Dance chart after spending twenty-six weeks on the chart.

In June 2013, she released her third album The Rapture. The album spawned the singles: "Never Stop", "Deep in Vogue", "Say It Ain't So", and "Red Lipstick". In November 2016, Wilson-James began her one-woman show tour called "Perseverance".

In November 2017, Wilson-James released a single titled "Pray". The song is part of "P.R.A.Y. (Project Resonance Ascension Yantra)" and released as a free download on her SoundCloud page.

Discography

Studio albums

Compilation albums

Singles

Filmography

References

External links
 
 

African-American women singer-songwriters
American women singer-songwriters
American dance musicians
American expatriates in the United Kingdom
American women pop singers
American house musicians
American rhythm and blues singer-songwriters
American soul singers
English dance musicians
English women singers
Living people
Musicians from Gary, Indiana
Year of birth missing (living people)
20th-century American women singers
21st-century American women singers
The Shamen members
20th-century American singers
21st-century American singers
Singer-songwriters from Indiana
Soul II Soul members